Skjolds Plads station is an underground Copenhagen Metro station at Skjolds Plads in the Outer Nørrebro district of Copenhagen, Denmark. It is on the City Circle Line (M3), between Vibenshus Runddel and Nørrebro. The station is situated at the intersection of Tagensvej and Haraldsgade, and is in Zone 2.

History
The station opened on 29 September 2019 together with 16 other stations of the line.

Design
The station is located under Skjolds Plads but the main staircase is located in the central reservation of Haraldsgade, facing Tagensvej. A secondary staircase is located at Skjolds Plads, Fafnersgade. The escalator shaft is clad with structured glass panels is a grey colour which is a reference to the University of Copenhagen's nearby North Campus.

Service

References

City Circle Line (Copenhagen Metro) stations
Railway stations opened in 2019
2019 establishments in Denmark
Railway stations in Denmark opened in the 21st century